Operation Friction was a Canadian military operation that saw the contribution of 4,500 Canadian Forces personnel to the 1991 Gulf War. The larger US components were Operation Desert Shield and Operation Desert Storm.

The supply ship  was deployed with the destroyers to provide underway replenishment as well as command/control and at-sea medical services to the small task force which operated in the Persian Gulf, Straits of Hormuz and Gulf of Oman.

Canada suffered no casualties during the conflict but since its end many veterans have complained of suffering from Gulf War syndrome.

Gulf War

Following UN authorization of military force to remove Iraq from occupied territory in Kuwait, AIRCOM deployed two CF-18 Hornet (24 aircraft) squadrons with support personnel from CFB Baden-Soellingen in Germany to a temporary base in Qatar.  Force Mobile Command also sent a large field hospital to Qatar to deal with casualties from the expected ground war.

During the Gulf War, Canada's CF-18 squadrons were integrated with Coalition air resources and provided combat air patrols as well as being involved in attacks of ground and water targets.  This was the first time since the Korean War that the Canadian military had participated in offensive combat operations.

Canadian components
Operation Friction saw approximately 4,500 CF personnel deployed to the Persian Gulf from August 1990 – February 1991 with a peak deployment of 2,700 personnel during the Gulf War in January 1991.

Personnel were primarily attached to four units in the Persian Gulf region:

 Canadian Task Group at sea
 the Canadian Air Task Group in Doha, Qatar
 the Joint Headquarters, Canadian Forces Middle East, in Manama, Bahrain
 First Canadian Field Hospital at Al-Qaysumah

The limited capabilities of the Canadian Army had been a factor in its very limited role in the 1991 Gulf War. While the military had been asked about the feasibility of sending 4 Canadian Mechanized Brigade Group (4 CMBG) from Germany to the Gulf to participate in direct combat operations, the Canadian Forces were forced to report that Operation "Broadsword", a theoretical deployment, would likely be a failure.

Joint headquarters
The headquarters of the Canadian Forces in the Middle East was a joint headquarters established on November 6, 1990, and commanded by Commodore Kenneth J. Summers. It included a communications unit and various joint military staffs.

Naval operations

Before the war began on January 16, 1991, Canadian naval forces patrolled the central Persian Gulf. When hostilities commenced, Captain Duncan "Dusty" Miller, Commander of the Canadian Naval Task Group, became the multinational co-ordinator for a large naval combat logistics area established in the southern Persian Gulf.

, an auxiliary oil replenishment ship, serviced all nations involved in naval operations within the Gulf. Five Sikorsky CH-124 Sea King helicopters based at CFB Shearwater and CFB Patricia's Bay were also attached to the Naval Task Group, performing reconnaissance, mine search and destroy, air-to-ship naval interdiction, utility and command-and-liaison tasks. Another Canadian destroyer,  arrived in theatre after hostilities ceased and was the first allied ship to visit Kuwait.

Air operations
The Canadian Forces Air Command provided combat air patrols in the north and central areas of the Persian Gulf. These patrols worked with the coalition air forces to protect coalition naval forces and land bases from Iraqi air attacks.

As the conflict progressed, the Canadian Air Task Group took on other combat roles, such as sweep and escort for coalition bombing missions and later, air-to-ground bombing missions. Canadian pilots were credited with partially destroying an Iraqi patrol boat in the Persian Gulf, and Canadian CF-18 jets carried out 56 bombing sorties against Iraqi forces.

Canadian Forces in the Gulf were supported by Air Command’s Transport Group, providing personnel and cargo transport using a fleet of 27 CC-130 Hercules and five CC-137 Boeing 707, one of which was used in the Gulf as an air-to-air refueler for Coalition air forces. The Transport Group also provided a CC-144 Challenger in a command-and-liaison role for the deployed Commander of the Canadian Forces.

Canadian Field Hospital
On the day that the US Operation Desert Storm component of the Gulf War began, January 16, 1991, Canada announced that it would send a field hospital to the Persian Gulf region. As a result, 1 Canadian Field Hospital from Petawawa, Ontario, joined the British land forces and was deployed in the Saudi Arabian desert behind 1 (UK) Armoured Division. The hospital became fully operational on February 25, 1991, only a few days before the hostilities ceased; it stopped operating on March 4, 1991.

References

Friction
Friction
Naval history of Canada
Canada–Iraq military relations
Canada–Kuwait military relations